The BBCH-scale (potato) identifies the phenological development stages of a potato (Solanum tuberosum).  It is a plant species-specific version of the BBCH-scale.

1 For second generation sprouts
2 Stem development stops after termination of main stem by an inflorescence.
Branches arise from axils of upper leaves of the main stem, exhibiting a
sympodial branching pattern

References

 H. Hack, H. Gall, Th. Klemke, R. Klose, U. Meier, R. Stauss, A. Witzenberger. 2001. The BBCH scale for phenological growth stages of potato (Solanum tuberosum L.). U. Meier (Ed.), Growth Stages of Mono and Dicotyledonous Plants, BBCH Monograph, Federal Biological Research Centre for Agriculture and Forestry.

External links
A downloadable version of the BBCH Scales
Alternative link to pdf above
BBCH-scale